In mathematics, Legendre transform is an integral transform named after the mathematician Adrien-Marie Legendre, which uses Legendre polynomials  as kernels of the transform. Legendre transform is a special case of Jacobi transform.

The Legendre transform of a function  is

The inverse Legendre transform is given by

Associated Legendre transform

Associated Legendre transform is defined as

The inverse Legendre transform is given by

Some Legendre transform pairs

References

Integral transforms
Mathematical physics